Mashkar may refer to:
 Mashkar, Hormozgan
 Mashkar, Khuzestan